Cloudscape is the self-titled debut album by Swedish progressive metal band Cloudscape, released through Metal Heaven in 2004. Guitarplayer Torben Enevoldsen (Section A, Fate) guests on guitarsolo on the outro of the openingtrack As The Light Leads The Way.

Track listing
All songs are written by Mike Andersson & Björn Eliasson.

As the Light Leads the Way – 4:42
Under Fire - 5:27
Aqua 275 - 4:11
Witching Hour - 5:00
In These Walls - 5:35
Out of the Shadows - 5:07
Everyday is Up to You - 4:00
Dawn of Fury - 4:37
Slave - 5:33
The Presence of Spirits - 4:31
Scream - 4:15
Losing Faith - 4:58
Inferno (Japanese bonus track)

Personnel
Mike Andersson - Lead & Backing Vocals
Björn Eliasson - Guitars
Patrik Svärd - Guitars
Haynes Pherson - Bass & Backing Vocals
Roger Landin - Drums & Percussion

Torben Enevoldsen - Guest guitarsolo on Track 1

References

External links

2004 debut albums
Cloudscape albums